The Labia family was a noble family of Venice. Originally merchants of Spanish origin, they bought their titles from the Venetian Republic in 1646. In the beginning of the 18th century the family built the Palazzo Labia on the Cannaregio Canal in Venice. 

It is the members of the Labia family of the mid 18th century to whom the palazzo owes its notability today, it was inhabited by two brothers with their wives, children and mother. 

The brothers Angelo Maria Labia and his brother Paolo Antonio Labia employed Giovanni Battista Tiepolo at the height of his powers to decorate the ballroom which was decorated by The Banquet of Cleopatra. Employing Tiepolo seems to have been the most remarkable thing the brothers ever achieved. Angelo Maria became an Abbé, merely in order to escape the political obligations of an aristocrat of the Republic. Curiously his holy employment did not prevent him marrying. His wife however was a commoner, which indicates an almost morganatic status to the marriage. Angelo's chief interests were constructing a marionette theatre, which concealed real singers behind its scenes. The marionettes often performed satirical plays which Angelo wrote himself. In later life he failed to endear himself to Venetian society by becoming an informer to the dreaded inquisition. His younger brother Paolo, married conventionally into the old Venetian aristocracy, a class prepared to accept the Labia's money and hospitality if not equality. Paolo too never assumed any public duties. It appears that it was their mother, Maria Labia, who was the intellectual driving force of the family, in her youth a great beauty, she was painted by Rosalba Carriera. The French traveller and social commentator Charles de Brosses reported that in old age she had a lively wit, flirtatious nature and possessed the finest collection of jewels in Europe. This collection was also portrayed in some of Tiepolo's work in the palazzo.

Republic of Venice families